Brooks Head Grove is an  biological Site of Special Scientific Interest in Gloucestershire, notified in 1986. The site is listed in the 'Forest of Dean Local Plan Review' as a Key Wildlife Site (KWS).

Location and habitat
It is situated within the Wye Valley Area of Outstanding Natural Beauty and is at the head of a small side valley of the River Wye south of English Bicknor. It overlies Carboniferous Lower dolomite and Lower Limestone Shales
which produces calcareous soils. It is part of the range of ancient broadleaved woodlands in the Wye Valley. In this vast collection of woodland there are many rare and local species.  These include Large-leaved Lime and Whitebeam, 
and trees near the edge of their European range such as Hornbeam.

References

SSSI Source
 Natural England SSSI information on the citation
 Natural England SSSI information on the Brooks Head Grove units

External links
 Natural England (SSSI information)

Sites of Special Scientific Interest in Gloucestershire
Sites of Special Scientific Interest notified in 1986
River Wye